Roberto Cantoral García (7 June 1935 – 7 August 2010) was a Mexican composer, singer and songwriter. He was known for composing a string of hit Mexican songs, including "El Triste", "Al Final", "La Barca" and "El Reloj"  The Sociedad de Autores y Compositores de México estimated that "La Barca" and "El Reloj" have been recorded over 1,000 times by other artists like Plácido Domingo, Gualberto Castro, José José, Luis Miguel, Joan Báez and Linda Ronstadt.  In 2009, he won the Latin Grammy Trustee Award.  Iconos, which was released by Marc Anthony in 2010, featured "El Triste".

Early life
Roberto Cantoral Garcia was born on 7 June 1935 in Ciudad Madero, Tamaulipas.  From an early age, he showed an ability for music and its composition. Cantoral moved to Mexico City to attend college but dropped out to become a band leader.

Career

1950–1960
In 1950, Cantoral formed the Hermanos Cantoral with Antonio Cantoral. The duo recorded "El preso número 9" and "El crucifijo de piedra".  The duo ended in 1954 with Antonio's death and Roberto formed Los Tres Caballeros with Chamin Correa and Leonel Gálvez who performed during Mexico's era of romantic music and traveled to Japan, Argentina and the United States.

1960–1980
In 1960, Cantoral went solo and achieved international fame for "Al final", "Noche no te vayas", "Regálame esta noche" and "Yo lo comprendo". In 1970, he wrote the ballad "El Triste" for José José. In 1971, he won the OTI Festival with "Yo no voy a la guerra" and in 1973 for "Quijote". Cantoral donated the proceeds from "Pobre navidad" to worldwide children institutions such as UNICEF and his song, "Plegaria de paz" was broadcast "three consecutive years at the Vatican".  Cantoral composed themes for El derecho de nacer, Paloma and Pacto de amor.

1980–2000
In 1982, Cantoral was elected as Sociedad de Autores y Compositores de México's Chairman of the Board for his first term.

Awards
During his lifetime, Cantoral received many awards.  He received medals of merit from Adolfo López Mateos and Josip Broz Tito.  In 1969, Cantoral won la presea Diana Cazadora and premio Cuauhtémoc de Oro.  He won three gold records for "El Reloj", "La Barca" and "El Triste".

Personal life

Cantoral resided in Rancho Viejo, Texas, just across the border from Mexico. His home, which suffered a fire in 2006 but was renovated, features a large marble clock in honor of his song, El Reloj, and several statues.

Cantoral was married to Itatí Zucchi and was the father of Mexican actress Itatí Cantoral, the co-star of the Televisa television series Hasta Que El Dinero Nos Separe. Roberto Cantoral had three sons, Carlos, Roberto and José, with Zucchi.

Death 
In 2010, 75-year old Cantoral died after suffering a heart attack on a flight from Brownsville, Texas, to Ciudad de México. The plane made an emergency landing in Toluca, Mexico, where Cantoral was pronounced dead. His body was placed on public view at the Palacio de Bellas Artes in Mexico City. Cantoral's ashes were scattered in his hometown, Tampico, Tamaulipas

Tribute
On June 7, 2021, Google celebrated his 85th birthday with a Google Doodle.

References

1935 births
2010 deaths
Mexican composers
Mexican male composers
Mexican male singer-songwriters
Mexican singer-songwriters
People from Cameron County, Texas
People from Tampico, Tamaulipas
People from Tamaulipas
Latin music songwriters
Mexican people of Spanish descent
Mexican people of Chilean descent
Mexican people of French descent